Allisyn Ashley Snyder (née Arm; born April 25, 1996) is an American actress, writer, artist, and director. She is known on screen for her main role as Zora Lancaster on Sonny with a Chance and its spin-off So Random! as well as Heather Wilmore on NBC's A.P. Bio. She is the co-owner of Watch The Footage Productions and has been producing since 2016.

Early life
Snyder was born Allisyn Ashley Arm on April 25, 1996, in Glendale, California, to Steven "Steve" and Anjanette "Anji" Kalanick Arm. Her mother is the half-sister of Uber co-founder and former CEO Travis Kalanick. At the age of four, her parents saw her fascination with theater and enrolled her in acting school where she was discovered by Lynne Marks who became her manager.

Career

Acting career 
Snyder appeared in over 60 commercials throughout her childhood. In May 2002, she made her first television appearance on the medical drama series: Strong Medicine. She would go on to make appearances in episodes of Friends, 10-8, Miracles, and Judging Amy. 

Snyder also had roles on films such as Meet Dave and King of California opposite Michael Douglas. In 2009, Snyder appeared as Zora in the Disney Channel hit series Sonny with a Chance, and in the spin-off series So Random! in 2011. Snyder also voiced the character Stormy in the Disney Junior series Jake and the Never Land Pirates. Regarding her roles, she told People (magazine), "I watch a lot of SNL skits online. I love Chris Farley and Jim Carrey. I always think, 'What would Jim Carrey do in this scene?' He's a lot of my inspiration for my character (Zora)."

In 2014, Snyder developed a YouTube personality named Astrid Clover. The web series ran for 7 years, with more than 350 episodes.

In 2018, Snyder was cast in NBC's comedy series A.P. Bio in which she plays a mousy high-schooler named Heather Wilmore.

Film career 
In 2016, Snyder launched her film career by teaming up with Bryan Morrison and Dylan Snyder to create Watch The Footage Productions. Six of her first four films received distribution with Fun Size Horror.

Personal life
Snyder is also an artist and had her first gallery showing at 15 years old. She enjoys roller derby and studies trapeze with her younger sister Josie. On Drew C. Ryan's Reel Geek Girls series, Allisyn shared her extensive collection of Fight Club memorabilia, which she considers her personal obsession. Snyder married Dylan Riley Snyder in 2019, eight years after the two met as teenagers on Disney Channel when Allisyn starred on So Random and Dylan starred on Kickin' It. Their shows were shot on production lots across from each other.

Filmography

Filmmaking

Music video

References

External links 

 
 
 Watch The Footage Productions website

1996 births
21st-century American actresses
Actresses from Glendale, California
American actresses
American child actresses
American people of Slovak descent
Living people